The Institute for a Broadband-Enabled Society (IBES) is an Australian research institute focusing on the development of broadband-enabled applications and technologies. The institute is based in the Department of Electrical and Electronic Engineering at The University of Melbourne in Victoria (Australia). Research in the centre is clustered around five research themes:
 Education and Learning
 Health and Wellbeing
 Network Deployment and Economics
 Service and Business Transformation
 Social Infrastructure and Communities

History 
The institute was established in 2009 with funding from the University of Melbourne and the State Government of Victoria. The Institutes aim is to develop research that will be able to exploit the Australian Government's National Broadband Network. IBES is one of a number of research institutes developed by the University of Melbourne to increase interdisciplinary research activity. 
The institute's Director is Laureate Professor Rod Tucker.

Organisation 
The institute was established in 2009. IBES is jointly funded by the University of Melbourne and the Victorian State Government, through the Department of Business and Innovation.

Advisory board 

The Advisory Board provides advice on matters relating to research directions, business strategies, and industry linkages. The members of the Advisory Board include:
 Steve Wood, CEO Tennis Australia
 Genevieve Bell, Intel Fellow
 Chris Hancock, CEO AARNet
 Shaun Page, VP, A/NZ Juniper Networks

Centres 
Two centres are associated with the Institute for a Broadband-Enabled Society these are:
 Centre for Energy-Efficient Telecommunications CEET, a joint partnership between Alcatel-Lucent's Bell Labs, The University of Melbourne and the Victorian State Government
 Centre for Health Informatics

Industry Partner Program 
The Industry Partner Program at IBES is modeled on similar programs that operate at universities in the United States. IBES has 20 partners that have included cash and in-kind support for IBES research. 
These companies are:
 Alcatel-Lucent
 Cisco
 Huawei
 Ericsson
 NEC
 Optus
 NICTA
 AARnet
 Opticomm
 Anue
 Allied Telesis
 Clarity
 Haliplex
 Microsoft
 Netgear
 Pacific Broadband Networks
 Telecom Test Solutions
 Warren and Brown

Research 
There are currently 144 researchers engaged in 40 research projects supported by IBES. Projects are supported through seed funding.

Test Bed 
The Test Bed is a core part of IBES' research. The Test Bed consists of end user, access, aggregation and transport components. These interconnect with typical retail service provider equipment. The equipment can be configured in a variety ways to allow almost any network topology and architecture to be simulated.

The end user component consists of passive optical network (PON) optical network termination devices - the customer end points of the fibre to the premises network. The Test Bed also houses examples of end user devices found in the home or office, such as 3D televisions, iPads, computers, notebooks and smart phones. Wireless routers, IPTV set top boxes and media servers have been donated by Netgear.  Cisco has donated Telepresence video conferencing equipment.
There are a number of different passive optical network systems in the test-bed which have been donated by Huawei, Allied Telesis and NEC. The aggregation and transport network consists of Huawei equipment. The service edge component provides connectivity to the Internet and co-located applications such as video on demand media servers, as well as connectivity to off-site hardware and applications.

References 
 Annual Report 2010, Institute for a Broadband-Enabled Society
 Institute for a Broadband Society website

External links 
 Institute for a Broadband-Enabled Society
 AUBroadband — "Information about various broadband plans and availability of fibre optic broadband in Australia"

University of Melbourne
Research institutes in Australia
Information technology research institutes
 Multidisciplinary
2009 establishments in Australia